Queen of Katwe (Original Motion Picture Soundtrack) is the soundtrack to the 2016 American film Queen of Katwe directed by Mira Nair. It was released by Walt Disney Records on September 23, 2016. The film, produced by Walt Disney Pictures and ESPN Films, stars David Oyelowo, Lupita Nyong'o, and Madina Nalwanga, and depicts the life of Phiona Mutesi, a girl living in Katwe, Uganda, who learns to play chess and becomes a Woman Candidate Master after her victories at World Chess Olympiads. The film is based on inscripts from the ESPN magazine article and a book written by Tim Crothers, based on her life.

The film's incidental music is composed by British musician Alex Heffes. The soundtrack consists of African pop and Afrobeat music, performed by rap artists originating from Africa and America, including Grammy Award-winning Alicia Keys, MC Galaxy, A Pass, Eddy Kenzo, Jose Chameleone, Afrigo Band, Moses Matovu and several artists. The score consisted of popular Ugandan music. Keys' single track "Back to Life" was released for promotional purposes on September 9, prior to the album release. A deluxe edition of the album was also released on the same day, that included Heffes' score along with the songs.

Development 
In January 2016, Alex Heffes was announced as the film's music composer. Speaking to Film Music Magazine, Heffes stated that the score is very "thematic, gentle and orchestral" in comparison to his score for miniseries Roots, though the film is set in Africa. He added the storyline is "universal" and "There are plenty of authentic Ugandan needle drop tracks in the film to set the scene so the score could concentrate more on the music story telling".

Nair's son Zohran Mamdani  Young Cardamom had curated and produced the soundtrack, while also acting as the music supervisor, along with Linda Cohen. He took inspiration from the musical scene in Katwe streets "to immerse the audience in the modern sound of Kampala". Mamdani had also recorded the track "#1 Spice" with HAB. In an interview to Teen Vogue, they stated that the song was curated several months ago, and while working as the music co-ordinator with Cohen, Mamdani had asked to provide an original song which they demanded that the character should sing along to in two scenes. He further exclaimed "The writing part was also interesting because it’s about salt farming, which we knew nothing about, but was central to the story of Phiona and the people around her. We researched what that whole experience was like and reading about those messed up realities and how much it can affect your body was intense. We found ways to work that into the narrative so listeners can learn something from it as well. I think overall, the song really captured the ethos of the film: the cycle of struggle, hustle and celebration."

The soundtrack featured several other prominent artists, mostly from African countries, including: Radio and Weasel, MC Galaxy, A Pass, P-Square, Davido, Jose Chameleone, Afrigo Band, Moses Matovu, Eddy Kenzo, Joanita Kawalya amongst several others. "Back to Life" an original song performed by 15-time Grammy Award-winning Alicia Keys was released as a promotional single on September 9, 2016. Explaining that the film's storyline, inspired her to write the song, Keys said that "This song is about how there’s no stopping when you’re determined and you believe in yourself."

Track listing

Reception 
LaughingPlace.com wrote that "The authentic African music makes you feel connected to the film’s characters and the city of Katwe" and praised Heffes' score stating "worth a listen isolated from the film and offers a very unique listening experience". Claudia Pigg of TheWrap wrote "The Afrocentric soundtrack and score by Alex Heffes utilizing native Ugandan instruments, is delightfully infectious". Mihr Fadnavis of Firstpost had stated that "Alex Heffes’ wonderful soundtrack that features native Ugandan instruments beautifully complements the visuals on the screen, which may leave you with a moist tear duct or two." NewsBytes-based Emma Meconi called the music and dancing was "uplifting" which "revealed the true character of the Ugandans, that of a joyful spirit, resilient nature and happy hearts."

Release history

Personnel 
Credits adapted from Allmusic

 Soundtrack producer – Mira Nair, Young Cardamom
 Score producer – Alex Heffes
 Music supervisors – Young Cardamom, Linda Cohen
 Music production supervisor – Ryan Hopman
 Music editors – Jim Bruening
 Engineers – Chris Barrett, Peter Cobbin, Carlo "Illangelo" Montagnese, Ann Mincieli 
 Music programming – Beth Caucci
 Music mixing – Peter Cobbin, Carlo Montagnese 
 Mastering – Patricia Sullivan Fourstar, David Kutch
 Music assistance – Sean Klein, Brendan Morawski, Jon Schater 
 Score conductor – Rebecca DaleMusic preparation – Colin Rae  
 Score co-ordinator and contractor – Hilary Skewes
 Score editor – Cécile de Tournesac
 Score mixing – Kirsty Whalley 
 Orchestration – Tommy Laurence, John Ashton Thomas
 Orchestra leader – Jonathan Morton
 Executive in-charge of music – Mitchell Leib 
 Creative art – Kaylyn Frank 
 Technical coordinator – Red Bennett

Accolades

References 

2016 soundtrack albums
Walt Disney Records soundtracks
Disney film soundtracks
Pop soundtracks
Afrobeat albums
Albums produced by Illangelo
Albums produced by Alicia Keys